Recomeço is the debut studio album of Brazilian rapper Mr. Gângster, released in 2013, containing the singles "Recomeço" and "Rolé a Noite".

Background
The recording of Recomeço began in 2012 and has the participation of singers Máximos, in the song Rolé a Noite, and Cesar Dreamer, in the song Campeão (Remix).
The album's first single was Recomeço, the most successful song of the album, which caused Mr. Gângster to be more widely recognized.
The second single from the album, Rolé a Noite, included the participation of Máximos, produced in part from the CDC Records label.

Track listing

References

Mr. Gângster albums